Richard Franklin Mirer (born March 19, 1970) is a former American football quarterback who played in the National Football League (NFL) for 12 seasons. He played college football at Notre Dame and was selected second overall by the Seattle Seahawks in the 1993 NFL Draft. In his first season, Mirer set the rookie records for passing yards, attempts, and completions. Unable to duplicate his success, however, Mirer was traded after four seasons to the Chicago Bears. He spent the remainder of his career with the New York Jets, San Francisco 49ers, Oakland Raiders, and Detroit Lions, mostly as a backup. Mirer is considered one of the biggest busts in NFL history.

Early years
Mirer was born in Goshen, Indiana. At age eight, he competed in the National Punt, Pass and Kick Competition. His father, Ken, was head coach at Goshen High School in Goshen, Indiana but retired before Mirer made the varsity team. Mirer posted 3,973 yards and 30 touchdowns in his senior year, 2nd most in national prep history, and eclipsing Jeff George's Indiana High School passing records. Earned Academy of Achievement Award as the top high school football player in the country in 1989, along with being the winner of the Atlanta Touchdown Club's Bobby Dodd Award as the nation's best high school quarterback.

College career
Mirer attended the University of Notre Dame from 1989–1992, accumulating a 29–7–1 record as starter – including 3 bowl games. He began his tenure serving as backup to Tony Rice, then took the reins of the Notre Dame offense in 1990 and led the team to the Orange Bowl. In 1991, Mirer set the single season touchdown record with 18 and was named co-MVP with teammate Jerome Bettis leading Notre Dame past Florida in the 1992 Sugar Bowl. He finished his career at Notre Dame by leading them to victory in the 1993 Cotton Bowl Classic. Mirer accounted for more points running and throwing (350) than any other player in Notre Dame history. He left Notre Dame 1st in career touchdowns with 41, and 2nd all time for total offense, completions, and passing yards; he was invited to play in the East-West Shrine Bowl, and Hula Bowl. Entering the 1993 Draft, he was hyped as the next Joe Montana, who also played college football at Notre Dame and was similar in stature. In 2008, Mirer was inducted into the Indiana Football Hall of Fame.

Statistics

Professional career

Mirer was selected with the second overall pick in the 1993 draft by the Seattle Seahawks. He signed a five-year, $15 million contract. In his rookie year under head coach Tom Flores, he set NFL rookie records for attempts, completions, and yards. In 1993 Rick became only the 3rd rookie quarterback since 1970 to start all of his team's games. He finished his rookie season fifth in the AFC with 274 completions and 2833 yards. He also shared the offensive rookie of the year with his former backfield teammate from Notre Dame, Jerome Bettis. Those rookie records were eventually broken by Andrew Luck. 

On February 18, 1997, Mirer was traded with a fourth round pick in the 1997 NFL Draft to the Chicago Bears for their first round draft pick, later packaged in a trade to the Atlanta Falcons to move up to 3rd overall that year to select Shawn Springs. Mirer signed a three-year, $11.4 million contract with the Bears, but played only seven games with three starts in the 1997 season.

Mirer requested to be released by the Bears in the beginning of the 1998 season and signed with the Green Bay Packers.  Mirer never played a down for Green Bay, which was led by Brett Favre, and was later traded to the New York Jets in 1999 where he replaced an injured Vinny Testaverde as the Jets starter. In 2000, he was signed by the San Francisco 49ers to compete with  Jeff Garcia. In 2002, Mirer became the a backup for the Oakland Raiders and became the starter for part of 2003. In 2004. Mirer was signed by the Detroit Lions, but saw no playing time. Mirer had a 63.5 passer rating, 11,969 passing yards, and 50 touchdown passes before he retired in 2004. Although playing for several teams that did make the playoffs during his career, Mirer never played a single down in the postseason.

NFL career statistics

Mirer posted a 24–44 record as regular season starter in 12 seasons in the NFL. He has career single game highs of 287 yards passing and three touchdowns.

See also
 List of celebrities who own wineries and vineyards

References

External links

1970 births
Living people
People from Goshen, Indiana
American football quarterbacks
Players of American football from Indiana
Notre Dame Fighting Irish football players
Seattle Seahawks players
New York Jets players
Chicago Bears players
San Francisco 49ers players
Oakland Raiders players
Detroit Lions players
Green Bay Packers players